Niggers in the White House is a poem that was published in newspapers around the United States between 1901 and 1903.  The poem was written in reaction to an October 1901 White House dinner hosted by Republican President Theodore Roosevelt, who had invited Booker T. Washington—an African-American presidential adviser—as a guest. The poem reappeared in 1929 after First Lady Lou Hoover, wife of President Herbert Hoover, invited Jessie De Priest, the wife of African-American congressman Oscar De Priest, to a tea for congressmen's wives at the White House. The identity of the author—who used the byline "unchained poet"—remains unknown.

Both visits triggered widespread condemnation by many throughout the United States, particularly throughout the South.  Elected representatives in Congress and state legislatures from southern states voiced objections to the presence of a black person as a guest of the First Family.

The poem is composed of fourteen four-line stanzas, in each of which the second and fourth lines rhyme. The poem also frequently uses the epithet nigger (over 20 times) as a term to represent African Americans. Republican Senator Hiram Bingham of Connecticut described the poem as "indecent, obscene doggerel."

History

The poem by "unchained poet" was written in 1901, appearing in Sedalia, Missouri's Sedalia Sentinel as "Niggers in the White House" on 25 October. It followed widespread news reports that President Theodore Roosevelt and his family had dinner with African-American presidential adviser Booker T. Washington at the White House on 16 October of that year. Several journalists and politicians condemned Roosevelt's action, claiming, among other things, that such an act made the two men appear equal in terms of social status. Democratic Senator Benjamin Tillman from South Carolina remarked, "The action of President Roosevelt in entertaining that nigger will necessitate our killing a thousand niggers in the South before they will learn their place again."

The poem was reprinted in the Greenwood Commonwealth in January 1903, after which it circulated in a number of newspapers during 1903, including in The Dispatch on 18 February 1903 and the Kentucky New Era on 10 March 1903. A card-mounted copy of the poem cut from the Sedalia Sentinel forms part of the Theodore Roosevelt papers preserved by the Library of Congress. A typed caption had been added, stating, "Publications like this show something of what is the matter with Missouri."

The poem resurfaced in June 1929 due to a public outcry triggered by another White House invitation. First Lady Lou Hoover, wife of President Herbert Hoover, invited the wife of Oscar DePriest to a tea event. De Priest was a member in the House of Representatives and the only African-American member in Congress in 1929. Mrs. Hoover had a series of teas with the wives of congressmen and Jessie De Priest was among the guests. Southern congressmen and newspapers reacted with public denouncements of the event. Democratic Senator Coleman Blease from South Carolina inserted the poem within a Senate resolution entitled, "To request the Chief Executive to respect the White House" in the upper chamber of Congress, which was read aloud on the floor of the United States Senate. However, the resolution, including the poem, was by unanimous agreement excised from the Congressional Record due to protests from Republican senators Walter Edge (from New Jersey) and Hiram Bingham (from Connecticut). Bingham described the poem as "indecent, obscene doggerel" which gave "offense to hundreds of thousands of our fellow citizens and [...] to the Declaration of Independence and our Constitution". Blease withdrew the resolution, but stated he did so "because it gave offense to his friend, Senator Bingham and not because it might give any offense to the Negro race". Scholar David S. Day argues that Blease's use of the poem may have been a populist gesture—"a normal Southern demagogic tactic"—but that Hoover's supporters saw it as something that went beyond even the "broad limits" of partisan political point-scoring.

Composition

The poem is composed of 14 stanzas with four lines per stanza. Every stanza is written in the simple 4-line rhyme scheme (abcb). The term "nigger" is used in all the stanzas of the poem except two. It is ascribed to "unchained poet", whose identity is unknown.

In Congressman Blease's version of the poem, the last four stanzas were omitted. The last three stanzas mention President Theodore "Teddy" Roosevelt and Booker T. Washington by name and the names of their respective children.

Edward J. Robinson links the poem's comments about racial intermarriage to a "Southern rape complex", according to which racial purity was threatened by the possibility of segregation dispersing in society, and by African-American male interest in Caucasian women.

Excerpt
The final three stanzas of the poem:
I see a way to settle it
  Just as clear as water,
Let Mr. Booker Washington
  Marry Teddy's daughter.

Or, if this does not overflow
  Teddy's cup of joy,
Then let Miss Dinah Washington
  Marry Teddy's boy.

But everything is settled,
  Roosevelt is dead;
Niggers in the White House
  Cut off Teddy's head.

See also

 A Guest of Honor –  the first opera created by Scott Joplin, the celebrated composer of ragtime music.  The operatic production was based on the 1901 White House dinner hosted by President Theodore Roosevelt for Booker T. Washington.
 Racism and ethnic discrimination in the United States

References

Newspaper publications
Missouri newspaper the Sedalia Sentinel on 25 October 1901
Moberly Weekly Monitor on 28 October 1901
Greenwood Commonwealth, 31 January 1903
The Tar Heel, 10 February 1903
The Dispatch, 18 February 1903
Kentucky New Era, March 13, 1903, p. 6
The Mt. Sterling Advocate, March 25, 1903
The Honolulu Evening Bulletin, 13 April 1903 (entitled "Koons in the Kapitol")

Sources

Further reading

Booker T. Washington incident

Jessie De Priest incident
 
American poems
1901 poems
Anti-black racism in the United States
Race-related controversies in literature
English-language poems
Presidency of Theodore Roosevelt
Presidency of Herbert Hoover
History of racial segregation in the United States
White House
71st United States Congress
Works of unknown authorship